Chishma (Şişmä) is a rural locality (a village) in Verkhneyanaktayevsky Selsoviet, Baltachevsky District, Bashkortostan, Russia. The population was 152 as of 2010. There are  5 streets.

Geography 
Chishma is located 19 km south of Starobaltachevo (the district's administrative centre) by road. Ishtiryakovo is the nearest rural locality.

References 

Rural localities in Baltachevsky District